Thompson v. Clark, 596 U.S. ___ (2022), was a United States Supreme Court case concerning whether a plaintiff suing for malicious prosecution must show that they were affirmatively exonerated of committing the alleged crime.  The Supreme Court, in a 6–3 opinion authored by Justice Brett Kavanaugh held that no such requirement existed and that a plaintiff suing for malicious prosecution in the context of a Fourth Amendment "need only show that his prosecution ended without a conviction."  Justice Samuel Alito dissented from the majority opinion and was joined by Justices Thomas and Gorsuch.  Media coverage of the decision portrayed the Court's ruling as a victory for civil rights lawsuits.

Background
Larry Thompson, a Navy veteran and postal worker, lived with his fiancée and newborn daughter in an apartment in Brooklyn, New York.  When Thompson's daughter was one week old, his sister-in-law called 911 and accused Thompson of sexually abusing the child.  Four police officers were dispatched to Thompson's house to investigate but Thompson refused to let them in without a search warrant.  In response, the four officers forced their way into Thompson's home and attempted to restrain Thompson.  Thompson resisted, was taken into custody for two days, and was subsequently charged with resisting arrest.  Further investigation by law enforcement revealed no signs of child abuse.  Rather than prosecute Thompson for resisting arrest, the prosecution opted to dismiss the charges.  Neither the prosecutor or the judge offered any explanation as to why the charges were dismissed.  

Following the dismissal of his criminal charges, Thompson filed suit against the officers responsible for arresting him under 42 U.S.C. § 1983 and alleging, among other things, that he had been maliciously prosecuted in violation of his Fourth Amendment rights, which provided the right against unlawful seizures. Thompson's claims were dismissed at the trial level and his appeal to the Second Circuit Court of Appeals was similarly denied as both courts held that, under existing precedent, Thompson was required to show that he had been affirmatively found innocent of committing the underlying crime.  On November 6, 2020, Thompson filed a petition for a writ of certiorari, which was granted on March 8, 2021.  During the October 12, 2021, oral argument, the justices posed a series of hypotheticals involving the fictional character of Jean Valjean and the mythological centaur.

Decision
On April 4, 2022, the Supreme Court released a 6–3 opinion authored by Justice Kavanaugh holding that Thompson was not required to show that he had been affirmatively exonerated of committing the alleged crime and, instead, "need only show that his prosecution ended without a conviction."  After analyzing the historical precedent, the majority opinion concluded that the general rule is that if a criminal proceeding was terminated prior to securing a conviction, the termination could be treated as favorable to the accused.  The majority further held that this conclusion was consistent with the purpose and values of the Fourth Amendment as, otherwise, the Fourth Amendment could be violated with impunity, so long as the prosecutor did not explain why the charge had been dropped.  With this holding pronounced, the Court remanded the case for further proceedings regarding whether Thompson had been "seized" under the Fourth Amendment, whether the officers had probable cause to enter Thompson's home without a warrant, and whether any of the officers were entitled to qualified immunity.

Justice Alito dissented from the majority's holding, arguing that Court had improperly combined precedent from different legal contexts in order to reach its conclusion.  Instead, the dissent argued that Thompson should have pursued alternative constitutional claims, rather than ones under the Fourth Amendment.

Reaction
Immediate media reaction to the Court's decision portrayed the ruling as victory for plaintiffs asserting civil rights claims against law enforcement officers.

References

External links 
 

United States Supreme Court cases
United States Supreme Court cases of the Roberts Court
United States Fourth Amendment case law